I Juseung may refer to:

Lee Joo-seung (born 1989), South Korean actor
Lee Ju-seung (born 1990), South Korean sledge hockey player